Kara Melek (The Dark Angel) is a TV series that was broadcast on Star TV and ran from 1997 to 2000. It was about a sly, clever and pretty woman called Yasemin (played by Sanem Çelik) as she tricked and schemed against her victims, and her innocent best friend Şule (played by Ece Uslu) who lives a complicated and hard life. Yasemin is the leading character and also the main villain, however, she can be kind and caring at times.

External links

Turkish drama television series
1997 Turkish television series debuts
2000 Turkish television series endings
1990s Turkish television series
2000s Turkish television series